The Anais da Associação Brasileira de Química (CODEN AABQAL) is a Brazilian scientific journal in chemistry. It was first published in 1942 under the title:

 Anais da Associação Química do Brasil, vol. 1 (1942) to vol. 9 (1950), (CODEN AAQBAH).

With volume 10 (1951) the title changed to:

 Anais da Associação Brasileira de Química, vol. 10 (1951) to vol. 52 (2003)?, (CODEN AABQAL).

The history of the Associação Brasileira de Química began in 1922 as Sociedade Brasileira de Química as an independent organ for druggists, biologists and chemists. This society published the Revista Brasileira de Chímica (Vol. 1 (1929) to Vol. 2, no. 7 (1931), CODEN RBCRAJ), which became the Revista da Sociedade Brasileira de Química in 1932.

This corporate body published the Anais da Associação Brasileira de Química starting from vol. 10 (1951).

Chief Editor is Prof. Dr. Julio Zukerman-Schpector, at the Departamento de Química at Universidade Federal de São Carlos (UFSCar).

See also 
 Journal of the Brazilian Chemical Society
 Revista Brasileira de Química
 Revista Brasileira de Engenharia Química, Caderno de Engenharia Química
 Química Nova

References

External links 
 Homepage of the journal: 
 Homepage of the Associação Brasileira de Química (ABQ): 

Chemistry journals
Defunct journals
Academic journals published by learned and professional societies of Brazil